Chloe Williams (born 22 December 2000) is a professional footballer who plays as a midfielder for Blackburn Rovers of the Women's Championship, with whom she is dual-registered from Women's Super League team Manchester United. Born in England, she has represented the Wales national team.

Club career

Wolverhampton Wanderers
Williams joined the Wolverhampton Wanderers academy aged 15 having started playing age 6 with local team Great Wyrley FC and later West Bromwich Albion. On 17 December 2017, Williams made her Wolves first team debut in an FA Cup second round defeat against Brighouse Town.

Manchester United
In July 2019, Williams joined FA WSL club Manchester United, initially as part of the club's under-21 squad but was named in a senior matchday squad for the first time on 20 October 2019 as an unused substitute for a League Cup group game against Manchester City.

Blackburn Rovers loan
On 14 November 2021, Williams joined Blackburn Rovers of the Women's Championship on loan for the season. On 14 August 2022, Williams returned to Blackburn Rovers for the 2022–23 season.

International career

Youth
Eligible to play for both England and Wales, Williams first attended trials for the Welsh national team following encouragement from her college tutor in July 2017. She went on to represent Wales at under-19 level, appearing in 2018 and 2019 UEFA Women's Under-19 Championship qualification.

Senior
In November 2018, Williams received her first senior call-up for friendlies against Portugal but was later forced to withdraw. A year later, Williams received her first competitive senior call-up for the UEFA Women's Euro 2021 qualifier against Northern Ireland in November 2019. She made her senior debut on 19 February 2022 against Belgium in the 2022 Pinatar Cup.

Career statistics

Club
.

International
Statistics accurate as of match played 19 February 2022.

References

External links
 

2000 births
Living people
Sportspeople from Walsall
English women's footballers
Welsh women's footballers
Wales women's international footballers
Women's association football midfielders
Wolverhampton Wanderers W.F.C. players
Manchester United W.F.C. players
FA Women's National League players